Moor House is a large office building on London Wall in the City of London.

Completed in 2004, it was the first building to be designed for the forthcoming Crossrail, with a ventilation shaft to the station underneath the building. When built, it had the deepest foundations in London, which reach down  and are specifically designed to withstand further tunneling below it in the future. The building cost £182 million to construct and was designed by Sir Norman Foster. Tenants include CLSA, Unicredit, Peel Hunt, TT International.

History
The site was previously home to a 1960s modernist office block. A postmodern redevelopment proposal was made in 1991 by Terry Farrell and Partners, the firm that designed the nearby Alban Gate.

In April 1999 the building was involved in a dispute over whether it should be granted planning permission.

Redevelopment of the area
A number of other large buildings are being planned on sites nearby. These include a 43-storey,  residential tower at Milton Court. A  office tower at Ropemaker Place is also being developed by British Land.

Nearest tube stations
 Moorgate tube station
 Liverpool Street station

See also
 CityPoint
 Tall buildings in London

References

Skyscrapers in the City of London
Skyscraper office buildings in London